For railway station in India see Nizamabad railway station.

Nizamabad railway station 
() is  located in  Pakistan.

See also
 List of railway stations in Pakistan
 Pakistan Railways

References

External links

Railway stations in Gujranwala District